The 2006 Kerry Senior Football Championship was the 106th staging of the Kerry Senior Football Championship since its establishment by the Kerry County Board in 1889. The championship ran from 6 May to 12 November 2006.

South Kerry entered the championship as the defending champions in search of a third successive title.

The final was played on 12 November 2006 at FitzGerald Stadium in Killarney, between South Kerry and Dr. Crokes in what was their second meeting in the final. South Kerry won the match by 0-12 to 1-08 to claim their eighth championship title overall and a third title in succession.

Declan Quill was he championship's top scorer with 1-28.

Team changes

To Championship

Promoted from the Kerry Intermediate Football Championship
 Killarney Legion

From Championship

Relegated to the Kerry Intermediate Football Championship
 Listowel Emmets

Results

Round 1

Round 2

Relegation playoff

Round 3

Quarter-finals

Semi-finals

Final

Championship statistics

Top scorers

Overall

In a single game

Miscellaneous
 South Kerry win three in a row for the first time in their history and are the first since East Kerry between 1997-99.
 Dr Crokes play in the Munster Senior Club Football Championship.
 The first round match between Laune Rangers and Austin Stacks was abandoned by the referee at half-time due to floodlight failure at Austin Stack Park.

References

Kerry Senior Football Championship
2006 in Gaelic football